The 2003 Bavarian Cup was the sixth edition of this competition which was started in 1998. It ended with the TSV Aindling winning the competition. Together with the finalist, TSV Gerbrunn, both clubs were qualified for the DFB Cup 2003-04.

The competition is open to all senior men's football teams playing within the Bavarian football league system and the Bavarian clubs in the Regionalliga Süd (III).

Rules & History
The seven Bezirke in Bavaria each play their own cup competition which in turn used to function as a qualifying to the German Cup (DFB-Pokal). Since 1998 these seven cup-winners plus the losing finalist of the region that won the previous event advance to the newly introduced Bavarian Cup, the Toto-Pokal. The two finalists of this competition advance to the German Cup. Bavarian clubs which play in the first or second Bundesliga are not permitted to take part in the event, their reserve teams however can. The seven regional cup winners plus the finalist from last season's winners region are qualified for the first round.

Participating clubs
The following eight clubs qualified for the 2003 Bavarian Cup:

Bavarian Cup season 2002-03 
Teams qualified for the next round in bold.

Regional finals

 The MTV Ingolstadt, runners-up of the Oberbayern Cup is the eights team qualified for the Bavarian Cup due to the FC Bayern Munich II from Oberbayern having won the Cup in the previous season.

First round

Semi-finals

Final

The reason for the one-sided result in the final can be seen in the fact that TSV Gerbrunn had withdrawn its team from the Bayernliga to the lower Bavarian amateur leagues, therefore fielding a much weaker side.

DFB Cup 2003-04
The two clubs, TSV Aindling and TSV Gerbrunn, who qualified through the Bavarian Cup for the DFB Cup 2003-04 both were knocked out in the first round of the national cup competition:

References

Sources
 Deutschlands Fussball in Zahlen 2002/03  Yearbook of German football, author: DSFS, publisher: Agon Sport Verlag, published: 2003, page: 286

External links
 Bavarian FA website  

2003
Bavarian